Balkonda is a village and a Mandal in Nizamabad district in the state of Telangana in India.

Geography

References 

Villages in Nizamabad district